Angelo Moratti Sports Centre (in Italian: Centro Sportivo Angelo Moratti) is Inter Milan's training ground. It is commonly known as Pinetina.

In 2016, the centre was renamed Centro Sportivo Suning in memoria di Angelo Moratti (Suning Training Centre in memory of Angelo Moratti) for sponsorship reason.

History
The construction work for the training ground started in 1960 under the Great Inter chairman Angelo Moratti and coach Helenio Herrera. The facility was ready for the 1961–62 season, and has been used uninterruptedly by Inter Milan since then.

Training complex
The centre is next to the Golf Club La Pinetina. It includes three pitches, one of regular size and two smaller artificial pitches that can be covered. The Suning Training Centre also include two gyms (250 m2 & 100 m2), a medical room, a swimming pool, three changing rooms, and two storerooms.

The main building at the centre houses 24 double rooms and two single rooms, a game room, a meeting room, and a television production studio, which hosts Inter TV, on the first floor, and a hall with a kitchen, a restaurant, and a press room on the ground floor.

References

External links
Angelo Moratti Sports Centre on Inter.it

Inter Milan
Angelo Moratti